Michael Aldous (born 26 November 1960) is a former Canberra Raiders rugby league footballer and representative coach of French national rugby league team.

Playing career
Raised in Nowra, New South Wales Aldous attended St Joseph's College, Hunters Hill in Sydney and played in the school's rugby union First XV in 1977 & 1978 at five-eighth. He represented at GPS level in both those years and in a New South Wales Schoolboy side in 1978. He was also an excellent schoolboy cricketer captaining St Joseph's, GPS and NSW schoolboy representative cricket XIs in 1978/79 before a career in first grade cricket for the Waverley club in Sydney, as a wicketkeeper batsman.

His professional rugby league career was with the Canberra Raiders.

Post playing
After injury, caused an early retirement Aldous became an Australian Schoolboys coach in rugby league and took a job as a Development Officer with the NSWRL.

In 2004, Aldous moved to France as a coaching consultant to the French Rugby League Federation. In November 2004, he coached France to a competitive 52–30 loss to the Kangaroos and a 24–20 loss to the Kiwis in Carcassonne.

From 2006 to 2017 he worked as Recruitment Coordinator for the Canberra Raiders. Aldous worked as a secondary school teacher of PDHPE, and Design and Technology at the selective high school Sydney Boys High School.

References

Footnotes

Published sources
 Whiticker, Alan & Hudson, Glen (2006) The Encyclopedia of Rugby League Players, Gavin Allen Publishing, Sydney
 St Joseph's College Annual Magazine Dec 1977
 St Joseph's College Annual Magazine Dec 1978

1960 births
Living people
Australian rugby league players
Australian sports coaches
Australian schoolteachers
Canberra Raiders players
France national rugby league team coaches
People educated at St Joseph's College, Hunters Hill
Rugby league fullbacks
Rugby league players from Nowra, New South Wales